This article contains a list of the oldest existing social institutions in continuous operation, by year of foundation, in the world. Inclusion in this list is determined by the date at which the entity met the traditional definition of an institution – may it be public, political, religious or educational – although it may have existed as a different kind of institution before that time. This definition limits the term "institution" to organisations with distinctive structural and legal features. It must also be still in operation, with continuity retained throughout its history, and so some institutions which were abolished at some point are excluded, despite resurrections (although these may be dealt with further down in this article). Some institutions re-emerge but with new foundations, and these too are omitted from the regular list.

State institutions

See also
 List of current monarchies

Religious institutions
 Major religious groups
 Religious denomination

Educational institutions

Schools

 The King's School, Canterbury, England, United Kingdom (597)

Universities

 University of Bologna, Bologna, Italy (1088; charter granted 1158)

Islamic seminaries

 University of Al Quaraouiyine, Fes, Morocco, founded as Islamic seminary in 859

Military academies
 Military Academy of Modena, Modena, Italy (1678)

Military institutions

Commercial institutions

 Kongō Gumi, a construction company founded in 578 in Japan

See also
 List of oldest banks in continuous operation
 List of the oldest newspapers

See also
 Institution
 Organization

References

Oldest
oldest institutions in continuous operation
Economy-related lists of superlatives
Oldest things
Lists of longest-duration things